Nong’an Town is a town in and the county seat of Nong'an County, in northwestern Jilin province, China, about  north of Changchun, the provincial capital. It is served by China National Highway 302 and is located just off G12 Hunchun–Ulanhot Expressway.

References

Township-level divisions of Jilin